Paul Haarhuis and Sandon Stolle were the defending champions but only Stolle competed that year with Sjeng Schalken.

Schalken and Stolle lost in the first round to Pablo Albano and David Macpherson.

Daniel Nestor and Nenad Zimonjić won in the final 6–1, 6–2 against Arnaud Clément and Sébastien Grosjean.

Seeds

  Daniel Nestor /  Nenad Zimonjić (champions)
  Sjeng Schalken /  Sandon Stolle (first round)
  Mark Knowles /  Brian MacPhie (first round)
  Bob Bryan /  Mike Bryan (first round)

Draw

External links
 Grand Prix de Tennis de Lyon Main Doubles Draw

Doubles
Doubles